Ahavath Achim Synagogue was located at 725 Hancock Avenue in Bridgeport, Connecticut. The building was built in 1926 and was added to the National Register of Historic Places on May 11, 1995, as "West End Congregation--Achavath [sic] Achim Synagogue". The building is a rare example in Bridgeport of a Colonial Revival house of worship containing details such as a portico with fluted columns and round arch stained-glass windows. Bridgeport architect Leonard Asheim designed many municipal and ecclesiastical buildings from 1910 to 1940.

History
The Orthodox synagogue was associated with Bridgeport's sizable Hungarian Jewish community whose members settled primarily in the city's West End. It now functions as a church, owned and occupied by Iglesia Christiana El Buen Pastor. Congregation Ahavath Achim moved to Fairfield in the 1960s.

Congregation Ahavath Achim (in English, Brotherly Love) was founded in Bridgeport's West End in 1904, meeting in the homes of members until they were able to move to a more permanent location. As the immigrants prospered in their new homeland, they decided to build a "magnificent structure [using] the most modern techniques, glorious stained-glass windows, a beautiful Aron Ha-Kodesh, a lovely, traditional bimah, Colonial pillars, a breath-taking landscaping development ... a gorgeous edifice that would evoke for a blessed generation the proud statement: 'This is my synagogue!'"

Ahavath Achim Synagogue was one of fifteen Connecticut synagogues added to the National Register of Historic Places in 1995 and 1996 in response to an unprecedented multiple submission, nominating nineteen synagogues. The structure was being used by a church congregation in 2013.

See also

History of Bridgeport, Connecticut
National Register of Historic Places listings in Bridgeport, Connecticut
Shimshon Youth Organization

References

External links

Hungarian-American culture in Connecticut
Hungarian-Jewish culture in the United States
Colonial Revival architecture in Connecticut
Georgian Revival architecture in Connecticut
Synagogues completed in 1926
Buildings and structures in Bridgeport, Connecticut
Former synagogues in Connecticut
Synagogues on the National Register of Historic Places in Connecticut
National Register of Historic Places in Fairfield County, Connecticut